The Grasse Funicular was a funicular line that previously connected the town of Grasse, France, with its railway station.

The railway station opened in 1871 and a funicular to connect Grasse's town centre and station was completed in 1909. In 1938, the  suspended passenger service resulting in the closure of the railway station and the funicular which was subsequently dismantled. In 2005, passenger service resumed to a rebuilt Grasse Railway Station.

Since the reopening of the railway station, there have been discussions on the potential reopening of the Grasse Funicular. By 2018, the project had gone back to the planning stage without any construction having occurred after significant community opposition and €16 million spent on feasibility studies.

References

Funicular railways in France
Rail transport in Provence-Alpes-Côte d'Azur
Defunct funicular railways
Railway lines opened in 1909
Railway lines closed in 1938